Anatoly Borisovich Chubais (born 16 June 1955) is a Russian politician and economist who was responsible for privatization in Russia as an influential member of Boris Yeltsin's administration in the early 1990s. During this period, he was a key figure in introducing a market economy and the principles of private ownership to Russia after the fall of the Soviet Union.

From 1998 to 2008, he headed the state-owned electrical power monopoly RAO UES. A 2004 survey conducted by PricewaterhouseCoopers and the Financial Times named Chubais the world's 54th most respected business leader. He was the head of the Russian Nanotechnology Corporation (RUSNANO) in 2008–2020. He was a member of the Advisory Council for JPMorgan Chase from September 2008 until 2013. From December 2020, he served as a special envoy of the Russian president for relations with international organisations. 

On 23 March 2022, Chubais resigned from his position of special envoy and left Russia due to his opposition to the Russian invasion of Ukraine, according to media reports. He is the highest ranked Russian figure to resign due to the invasion.

Early life

Chubais was born on 16 June 1955 in the town of Borisov, Belarus, which was then part of the Soviet Union, the son of Raisa Efimovna (Sagal) and Boris Matveyevich Chubais. His father was Russian and his mother was Lithuanian Jewish. His father, a retired army colonel and veteran of World War II, was in the military at the time of Chubais' birth, and later worked as a lecturer of Philosophy. Though his mother received a degree in economics at university, she opted to stay home to care for their children on the military bases where her husband was regularly assigned. Anatoly Chubais has an older brother, Igor Chubais (born 1947), a philosopher.

In 1977, Chubais graduated from the Leningrad Institute of Engineering and Economics (LEEI) in present-day St. Petersburg and joined the Communist Party of the Soviet Union until 1991 when he left it.

Career

Early career (1977–1991) 
While later working at LEEI, Chubais started a club called Reforma, which helped turn the city of Leningrad into a model of political reform by constructing platforms for both local and national elections. Reforma also engaged in drafting reformist legislation, an important step down the road when Chubais would work in the city government. In 1982, he attained the rank of Associate Professor (доцент) at LEEI, while in 1983, he received his Candidate of Sciences (Ph.D.) degree in Economics for the dissertation entitled "Исследование и разработка методов планирования совершенствования управления в отраслевых научно-технических организациях" (Research and Development of Methods for the Planned Improvement of Management in Industrial Research and Development Organizations).

Starting in the early 1980s, Chubais became a leader of an informal circle of market-oriented economists in Leningrad. In 1982, together with economists Yury Yarmagayev and Grigory Glazkov, he published an article titled "Вопросы расширения хозяйственной самостоятельности предприятий в условиях научно-технического прогресса" (Questions of Expanding the Autonomy of Business Enterprises under the conditions of Scientific and Technological Progress) in which the authors argue that no amount of central planning can predict the end-demand for products. In 1982, Chubais was introduced to the future Prime Minister of Russia Yegor Gaidar, who was invited to and attended seminars led by Chubais.

By 1987, Chubais had become the organiser of the Leningrad chapter of the club Perestroyka, whose mission was to promote and discuss democratic ideas among the local intelligentsia. Among the people involved were his brother, Igor, who had founded the Moscow-based chapter of the Perestroyka and Perestroyka-88 clubs, future Russian Deputy Prime Minister Alexei Kudrin, future Chubais associates Pyotr Mostovoy and Alexander Kazakov, the future President of Saint Petersburg bank Vladimir Kogan, future Minister of Anti-Monopoly Policy and Entrepreneurship Support Ilya Yuzhanov, and future Deputy Governor of Saint Petersburg Mikhail Manevich.

The dissident economists organized a tulip farm to finance their seminars. In the four days before the International Women's Day (8 March), they managed to get income equivalent to the price of several Lada cars. The tulip money was used to finance the elections of Anatoly Sobchak, Yury Boldyrev and many other democratic candidates. As a result, 2/3 of the deputies winning the 1990 elections to Leningrad Soviet were from the opposition. Chubais himself later stated that he personally did not participate in growing or selling of the flowers.

At the end of 1990, the economist Vitaly Nayshul proposed the idea of using vouchers to facilitate mass privatization in order to transform the Soviet Union into a market economy. Chubais strongly criticized the scheme at the time, citing the inevitable inequality and social tensions that would result if implemented as proposed. Ironically, Chubais would later become the champion of the same concept just several years later.

Privatization chief in Leningrad (1990–1994) 

In 1990, upon the election of Anatoly Sobchak as Chairman of the Leningrad City Council, Chubais assumed the position of his Deputy. He was trying to implement Sobchak's idea of creating a Free Economic Zone in Leningrad. In 1991, Chubais declined the offer to become the Chairman of Leningrad Ispolkom to instead become an advisor to the mayoral administration in Leningrad (by now renamed St. Petersburg) where Sobchak had just been elected mayor. At the same time, Chubais worked as the president of newly established Wassily Leontief Center for Research in Economics.

In Yeltsin government (1992–1999) 
In November 1991, Chubais became a minister in the Yeltsin Cabinet where he managed the portfolio of Rosimushchestvo (the Committee for the Management of State Property) which was handling privatization in Russia.

Chubais originally advocated rapid privatization in order to raise revenue, similar to the model used in Hungary. However, the Congress of People's Deputies of Russia rejected this model. Eventually, a compromise was proposed in the form of a voucher privatization program akin to the program used in the Czech Republic at the time. On 11 June 1991, the Supreme Soviet of Russia adopted this compromise and the massive program was officially initiated by decree of President Boris Yeltsin on 19 August 1991. This privatization program later came under heavy criticism. While most Russian citizens lost their savings in only a few weeks, a few oligarchs rapidly became billionaires by arbitraging the vast difference between the old domestic prices for Russian commodities versus the prices prevailing on the world market. The people who benefited from this arbitrage became known as "kleptocrats" because they stashed billions of dollars in Swiss bank accounts rather than investing in the Russian economy.

From November 1994 until January 1996, Chubais held the position of deputy prime minister for economic and financial policy in the Russian government. Thanks to liberalizing reforms carried out in 1995, the Russian Government was finally enjoying a measure of financial stability, something its politicians had been seeking ever since the resignation of Yegor Gaidar in 1993. By the end of 1995, the average annual inflation rate had declined from 18% down to 3%.

From April 1995 until February 1996, Chubais also represented Russia in two international financial institutions – the International Bank for Reconstruction and Development (IBRD) and the Multilateral Investment Guarantee Agency (MIGA).

After resigning as deputy prime minister in January 1996, Chubais agreed to manage Boris Yeltsin's reelection campaign. By this time according to public opinion surveys, Yeltsin's approval rating had fallen to roughly 3%. Chubais established the Civil Society Foundation as well as Yeltsin's Campaign Analytical Group, which became one part of the Foundation. The group helped Yeltsin regain popularity and win re-election in the second round of the polls on 3 July 1994, capturing 53.82% of the popular vote.

From July 1996 until March 1997, Chubais was the chief of the Russian Presidential Administration. During his tenure, his office grew increasingly influential.

Chubais participated in the Bilderberg Club session in Turnberry, Scotland in 1998, and co-chaired the Round Table of Industrialists of Russia and the EU during the joint session of the Government Commission of the Russian Federation and the European Union. He was also elected to the Board of Russian Union of Industrialists and Entrepreneurs in 2000.

According to Yeltsin's daughter and chief of staff Tatyana Yumasheva, Chubais opposed the nomination of Vladimir Putin as Prime Minister of Russia and Yeltsin's successor in 1999. Although Chubais believed Putin was qualified for the position, he feared that his appointment would be rejected by the State Duma, allow the Communist Party of the Russian Federation to gain a large enough parliamentary majority to amend the constitution, and start a civil war.

RAO Unified Energy System of Russia (1998–2008) 

In 1998, Chubais was elected to the chairman of the board of RAO UES of Russia, the state-owned electricity monopoly, at a special general meeting of shareholders; he soon was also appointed chairman of the board.

Since 2000, Chubais consistently defended the need for further reform, which included dis-aggregating power generation, transmission, and distribution activities from the monopoly holding company in order to facilitate the subsequent sale of a majority of shares to private investors. Chubais was convinced that the un-bundling and privatization of the state monopoly were the only mechanisms able to raise the substantial funds needed to modernize Russia's electricity sector.

He was elected president of the CIS Electric Power Council (2000), and later was repeatedly re-elected to that post from 2001 to 2004.

In addition to reforms, Chubais and his team raised more than $30 billion in private investments for the Russian electric power sector. The funds were used to finance the construction of new facilities: 130 new units with a total capacity of about 29,000 MW, 10,000 kilometers of transmission lines, 60,000 kilometers of distribution network lines, and thousands of electrical sub-stations of all classes of voltage. His reforms also helped eliminate the use of barter payments and significantly reduced the number of payment defaults in the sector.

On 17 March 2005, he survived an assassination attempt. Vladimir Kvachkov was charged for the crime, but was acquitted by a jury.

In 2007, the Russian newspaper Vedomosti named Chubais the "Professional of the Year". The paper called him the only professional reformer in Russia because of his achievements in breaking of one monopoly into dozens of independent entities, introducing market forces into the electricity distribution system, and transforming a government institution structure into one attractive for private investment and management.

In July 2008, RAO UES of Russia ceased to exist as a legal entity.

RUSNANO (2008–2020) 

Since September 2008, Chubais has been General Manager of the State Corporation Rosnanotech.

The official business of the corporation is to promote innovation and modernization in Russia's economy in several areas. For example, RUSNANO forms an important part of the government's strategy to find economic alternatives to fossil fuels.  The corporation has set a target of 900 billions rubles in sales by 2015. In the past, Chubais has compared RUSNANO to a garden in which the corporation cultivates innovative business ventures. Over its eight years of operation (2007–2015), RUSNANO has completed over 100 investment projects which resulted in the opening of 68 new plants and 28 R&D centers. As stated in the annual RUSNANO groups' financial report, the value of RUSNANO's portfolio was estimated in 2015 at 227.7 billion rubles and its net income at 17 billion rubles.

Chubais has been a member of the Skolkovo Foundation Council since 2010, and in 2011 was elected chairman of the board of LTD RUSNANO.

He left the organization in December 2020.

Resignation (2022) 
On 23 March 2022, after Russia launched a large-scale invasion of Ukraine, Chubais quit his official positions, including that as climate envoy, stating that he was opposed to the invasion, according to media reports. Kremlin spokesperson Dmitry Peskov confirmed that Chubais had resigned, but did not specify why, stating: "Whether he left or not is his personal matter". Chubais left Russia, arriving in Istanbul, Turkey, on the same day, planning to remain abroad. Alexei Navalny's spokesperson, Kira Yarmysh, suggested that Chubais had "left Russia only out of fear for his own skin and his own money". He was the highest ranked Kremlin official to resign following the start of the invasion, though he is not a member of Putin's inner circle.

Personal life

Chubais is married to Dunya Smirnova (a screenwriter and TV presenter), and has two children from his first marriage: a son, Aleksey, and a daughter, Olga.

On 1 August 2022, Chubais told Russian journalist Ksenia Sobchak that he had been hospitalised with the neurological disorder Guillain-Barré syndrome, though Sardinian newspaper L’Unione Sarda reported that Italian authorities had not yet ruled out poisoning, and Italian intelligence services are awaiting his blood toxicology results in order to make sure he was not poisoned.

Involvement in political parties

In June 1993, Anatoly Chubais co-founded the "Russia's Choice" electoral bloc (Vybor Rossii), which was headed by Yegor Gaidar. In December 1993, running under this bloc, Chubais was elected as a deputy to the Russian State Duma in its first convocation.

On 12–13 July 1994, Chubais was elected to the governing council of the party "Democratic Choice of Russia", which had been built off the electoral bloc "Russia's Choice". In December 1998, Chubais became a member of the Organizing Committee of Right Cause coalition and was elected to the Steering Committee of the Organizing Committee of this coalition.

In July 1996, Chubais founded the "Center for Protection of Private Property" Foundation.

In May 2000, Chubais was elected co-chairman of the Coordinating Council of the Russian National Political Organization "Union of Right Forces" at its founding congress. He was also later elected co-president and a member of the Federal Political Council on 26 May 2001, during the founding congress of the "Union of Right Forces" Party (SPS).

On 24 January 2004, he resigned from his post as co-chair of the party but remained on the Federal Political Council of the SPS party.

In May 2010, Chubais became the chairman of the board of trustees of the Gaidar Foundation, jointly established by the Gaidar Institute for Economic Policy and Maria Strugatsky.

Awards

In 1997, the British magazine Euromoney named him the world's best Minister of Finance.

In December 2001, Chubais was awarded an honorary diploma of International Award by the International Union of Economists for his significant contributions to the Russian Federation, specifically his work applying advanced international experience to introduce contemporary methods of organizing administration, economics, finances and production processes.

In 2008, Chubais was awarded a Presidential Commendation for helping draft part of the Russian Constitution as well as his overall contributions to democracy in Russia.

In 2010, Chubais was honored by with IV degree Order For Merit to the Fatherland "for outstanding contribution to the implementation of state policy in the field of nanotechnology and many years of favorable work".

Chubais received three presidential commendations (awarded in 1995, 1997 and 1998) and as well as one honorary Ph.D. from the St. Petersburg State Engineering and Economic University.

References

External links

Commanding Heights : Anatoly Chubais on PBS
Father to the Oligarchs by Arkady Ostrovsky, Financial Times, 13 November 2004
Rusnet Encyclopedia
Russia Profile Who's Who
Russia's Regent by Paul Quinn-Judge, Time, 9 December 1996.

1955 births
Living people
1st class Active State Councillors of the Russian Federation
20th-century Russian Jews
21st-century Russian businesspeople
Finance ministers of Russia
First convocation members of the State Duma (Russian Federation)
People from Barysaw
Russian liberals
Russian people of Belarusian descent
Russian people of Lithuanian-Jewish descent
Jewish Russian politicians
Communist Party of the Soviet Union members
Union of Right Forces politicians
Deputy heads of government of the Russian Federation
Kremlin Chiefs of Staff
Moscow Power Engineering Institute alumni
Russian activists against the 2022 Russian invasion of Ukraine